Far Far North is a three-song EP released by the band Einherjer in 1997. The final two tracks are re-recorded versions of songs from the band's 1995 EP Leve Vikingånden.   Those two songs have Norwegian language lyrics, while the title track has English lyrics.

Track listing
 "Far Far North"
 "Når Hammeren Heves"
 "Når Aftensolen Rinner"

Music by Storesund/Glesnes.  Lyrics by Glesnes/Storesund/Bjelland.

Credits
 Rune Bjelland – vocals
 Frode Glesnes – guitar
 Audun Wold – guitar
 Stein Sund – bass guitar
 Gerhard Storesund  – drums, synthesizer

References

Einherjer albums
1997 EPs